Kazi Abul Monsur (1918 – 20 February 1996) was a physician and microbiologist of Bangladesh. He was awarded Independence Day Award posthumously in 1996 by the Government of Bangladesh for his contribution in the field of medical science.

Early life and education
He was born in 1918. He graduated with a gold medal from Calcutta Medical College in 1943.

Career
He was the professor of Pathology and Bacteriology at Dhaka Medical College and Hospital. He received international acclaim for developing Monsur's Media for the isolation of cholera and the President's "Pride of Performance" medal (Science) in 1966. He set up the first intravenous fluid plant in Bangladesh while Director of the Institute of Public Health, 1961–1972. He stepped down from the board of trustees of ICDDR’B in protest against the sidelining of Bangladesh's national interests.

Awards 
 Independence Day Award, 1996

References

1918 births
1996 deaths
Recipients of the Independence Day Award
Medical College and Hospital, Kolkata alumni
Academic staff of Dhaka Medical College and Hospital